Jessie is an American 1984 ABC television police drama series starring Lindsay Wagner as a psychiatrist. It originated as a 1984 television movie. The series was based in part on the book "Psychologist with a Gun".

Summary
The 2 hour ABC pilot of Jessie was originally set in Tucson Arizona, a turbulent western town, The television series Jessie revolved around the criminal investigations of Dr Jessie Hayden and her sometimes unorthodox work and tactics at the police station.

A psychiatrist, Dr. Jessie Hayden, is hired by a California police department to help the department employees and the victims.

Cast
 Lindsay Wagner as Dr. Jessie Hayden
 Tony Lo Bianco as Lt. Alex Ascoli
 Celeste Holm as Molly Hayden
 Tom Nolan as Officer Hubbell
 Renee Jones as Ellie
 James David Hinton as Phil
 William Lucking as Sgt. Mac McClellan
 Peter Isacksen as Office Floyd Comstock

Episodes

References

External links

American Broadcasting Company original programming
1980s American drama television series
1984 American television series debuts
1984 American television series endings
English-language television shows
Television series by MGM Television
Television shows set in California